National Bank of Whittier Building is a historic building in uptown Whittier, California.  Built in 1923 by John and David Parkinson in the Beaux Arts Neoclassical architecture style, the building was added to the National Register of Historic Places in 1982.

The current building is the best remaining example of the Beaux Arts style in the City. The building is of national significance as it was the site of Richard M. Nixon's first law office.  Whittier was Nixon's boyhood home from the age of nine.  In 1938 he served as the Deputy City Attorney to the City of Whittier.  A replica of President Nixon's office has been re-created and is available to tour at the Whittier Historical Museum.

References

Whittier, California
Buildings and structures in Los Angeles County, California
Buildings and structures on the National Register of Historic Places in Los Angeles County, California
Commercial buildings on the National Register of Historic Places in California
Commercial buildings completed in 1923
John and Donald Parkinson buildings
Neoclassical architecture in California
Beaux-Arts architecture in California